The Dora Wasserman Yiddish Theatre, a branch of the Segal Centre for Performing Arts, was founded in Montreal in 1958 by Dora Wasserman (June 1919– December 2003), a Ukrainian actress, playwright, and theatre director.

The first play was The Innkeeper.
Wasserman directed over 70 plays over four decades.  One review said that "The most successful of these was A Bintel Brief, based on immigrants' letters to the advice column of the Jewish Daily Forward", referring to a Yiddish newspaper.

The Dora Wasserman is one of the few remaining Yiddish theaters in the world.

See also
Federation CJA
Jews in Montreal

References

External links 
 Theatre Web site
 Jewish Theatre.com article on the Dora Wasserman Yiddish Theatre
 Jewish Theatre.com obituary for Dora Wasserman
Segal Centre for Performing Arts 

Ashkenazi Jewish culture in Montreal
Yiddish theatre
Theatre companies in Quebec
Organizations based in Montreal
Jewish Canadian culture
Jewish theatres
Jewish organizations based in Canada
Jews and Judaism in Montreal
Organizations established in 1958
Côte-des-Neiges–Notre-Dame-de-Grâce
Yiddish culture in Canada
1958 establishments in Quebec
Theatre in Montreal